Spoof, spoofs, spoofer, or spoofing may refer to:
 Forgery of goods or documents
 Semen, in Australian slang
 Spoof (game), a guessing game
 Spoofing (finance), a disruptive algorithmic-trading tactic designed to manipulate markets


Culture
 A type of satire, specifically a parody, in which an original work is made fun of by creating a similar but altered work.
 Spoof film (aka parody film), a cinematographic genre
 Spoofing (anti-piracy measure), a technique to curb unlawful online downloading

Science and technology
 Biometric spoofing, fooling a biometric identification device
 DLL spoofing, using an insecure DLL loading routine to load a malicious DLL file

Networking and communications
 Protocol spoofing, a technique to increase performance in data communications
 Spoofing attack, the falsifying of data on a telecommunications network
 ARP spoofing
 Caller ID spoofing
 E-mail spoofing
 IP address spoofing
 MAC spoofing
 Referrer spoofing
 SMS spoofing
 Spoofed URL 
 Website spoofing

See also
 Meaconing, the interception and rebroadcast of navigation signals
 Replay attack, a network attack in which transmitted data is fraudulently repeated or delayed